Charles Guy Holdaway (28 February 1886 – 1973) was a British athlete.  He competed at the 1908 Summer Olympics in London.

In the first round of the 3200 metre steeplechase competition, Holdaway defeated countryman Joseph Kinchin and a pair of Americans, winning a chance to compete in the final.  There, he started off quickly but fell to fourth place, finishing with a time of 11:26.0.

References

External links
profile
Record of Guy Holdaway's death

1886 births
1973 deaths
British male middle-distance runners
British male steeplechase runners
Olympic athletes of Great Britain
Athletes (track and field) at the 1908 Summer Olympics